Sejal Saglani is a British medical researcher who is Professor and Head of the Inflammation, Repair and Development Section at the National Heart and Lung Institute. Her research considers wheeze and severe childhood asthma. She serves as an Honorary Consultant in Paediatric Respiratory Medicine at the Royal Brompton Hospital.

Early life and education 
Saglani earned her undergraduate degree in medicine at the University of Leicester. She completed her specialist training in the Thames Valley in respiratory medicine, with a focus on paediatrics. She moved to the National Heart and Lung Institute (NHLI) for her graduate studies, where she investigated severe infant and pre-school wheeze. She was awarded the NHLI thesis prize for her doctorate.

Research and career 
Saglani was awarded a British Lung Foundation Fellowship to develop a model of allergic asthma. Once she had established the model, she was awarded a Wellcome Trust Fellowship to study the pathophysiological abnormalities of asthma, which impacts 1 in 10 children in the United Kingdom.

In 2018, Saglani became Head of the Inflammation, Repair and Development (IRD) section at the NHLI. At the NHLI, she continued to study pre-school wheeze and childhood severe asthma. To better understand respiratory disease, she makes use of airway samples from children, as well as neonatal mouse models. By treating newborn mice with farmyard microbes (Acinetobacter lwoffii), Saglani demonstrated that early interventions in children with asthma could reduce their respiratory conditions and prevent them from developing abnormal lung function later in life. She showed that this occurs because mice treated with Acinetobacter Iwoffii have reduced levels of Interleukin 13, an inflammatory marker produced by their T cells, which protected them from airway hyper-responsiveness. This indicated that the bacteria lessen inflammatory pathways. Her studies also indicated that younger mice had more active T-cells, which can result in increased wheeze. The immune response of mice that had been exposed to Acinetobacter Iwoffii (and therefore prepared to produce Interleukin 13) was amplified compared to their non-exposed counterparts.  She serves as an Honorary Consultant in Paediatric Respiratory Medicine at the Royal Brompton Hospital.

Awards and honours 
 European Respiratory Society Young Investigator Award for Paediatric Research
 European Respiratory Society Romain Pauwels Award for Translational Asthma Research
 International Klosterfrau Award for Childhood Asthma

Selected publications

References 

21st-century British medical doctors
Academics of Imperial College London
Alumni of the University of Leicester
Alumni of Imperial College London
Year of birth missing (living people)
Living people